Events from the year 1862 in Scotland.

Incumbents

Law officers 
 Lord Advocate – James Moncreiff
 Solicitor General for Scotland – Edward Maitland; then George Young

Judiciary 
 Lord President of the Court of Session and Lord Justice General – Lord Colonsay
 Lord Justice Clerk – Lord Glenalmond

Events 
 24 February – St Abb's Head lighthouse first illuminated. Butt of Lewis Lighthouse is also completed this year.
 May – the 10.00 a.m. "Special Scotch Express", predecessor of the Flying Scotsman express train, first departs from London King's Cross railway station for Edinburgh Waverley over the East Coast Main Line.
 1 June – the 10.00 a.m. passenger service, predecessor of the Royal Scot express train, first departs from London Euston railway station for Glasgow over the West Coast Main Line.
 July – the Glasgow & Stranraer Steam Packet Company's  enters service on the first Stranraer to Larne ferry service.
 28 August – the Portpatrick Railway opens to Portpatrick; on 1 October it opens its branch to Stranraer Harbour.
 31 August – last mail coach runs from Carlisle to Hawick.
 20 September – SS Irishman runs aground on Skernataid Rock between the islands of Raasay and Scalpay, Inner Hebrides.
 11 October – Jessie M'Lachlan, having been found guilty in the Sandyford murder case in Glasgow, is to be hanged, but has her sentence commuted to life imprisonment.
 13 October – Winchburgh rail crash: A head-on collision on the Edinburgh and Glasgow Railway kills 15.
 18 December – "Day of the Great Drowning": 31 men, the entire crews of five fishing boats from Ness, Lewis, are drowned in a storm.
 Prime gilt, a duty levied by Trinity House of Leith on goods coming into the port, is abolished.
 Henry Littlejohn becomes Edinburgh's first Medical Officer of Health, serving until 1908.
 David Kirkaldy publishes Results of an Experimental Inquiry into the Comparative Tensile Strength and other properties of various kinds of Wrought-Iron and Steel in Glasgow describing his pioneering work in tensile testing.
 Bishop Robert Eden is elected Primus of the Scottish Episcopal Church, an office he will hold until his death in 1886.
 Establishment of Anderson High School (Shetland) in Lerwick.
 Tom Morris, Sr. wins The Open Championship at Prestwick Golf Club, Ayrshire.
 First Aberdeen Angus herd book created.
 Inverewe Garden created by Osgood Mackenzie in Wester Ross.

Births 
 1 January – Andrew Blain Baird, engineer and aviation pioneer (died 1951)
 28 June – William Younger, politician (died 1937)
 11 August – David Henderson, British Army officer (died 1921 in Switzerland)
 29 August – Andrew Fisher, Prime Minister of Australia (died 1928 in England)
 21 October – Donald Murray, Liberal Party Member of Parliament for the Western Isles from 1918 to 1922 (died 1923)
 26 October – David Anderson, Lord St Vigeans, Scottish advocate and judge, Chairman of the Scottish Land Court 1918–34 (died 1948)

Deaths 
 24 September – William Forbes Mackenzie, Conservative politician and temperance reformer (born 1807 in England)
 29 June – James Bowman Lindsay, inventor (born 1799)

See also 
 Timeline of Scottish history
 1862 in the United Kingdom
 1862 in Wales

References 

 
Years of the 19th century in Scotland
Scotland
1860s in Scotland